In 2013, a report by Transparency International revealed that political parties, Parliament, the judiciary and the military are the most corrupt institutions in Portugal. Transparency International's 2022 Corruption Perceptions Index ranks the country in 33rd place out of 180 countries in the Index.

Extent 
Transparency International’s Global Corruption Barometer 2013 reveals that political parties, Parliament, the judiciary and the military are the most corrupt institutions in Portugal.

Transparency International's 2022 Corruption Perceptions Index scored Portugal at 62 on a scale from 0 ("highly corrupt") to 100 ("very clean"). When ranked by score, Portugal ranked 33rd among the 180 countries in the Index, where the country ranked first is perceived to have the most honest public sector.  For comparison, the best score was 90 (ranked 1), and the worst score was 12 (ranked 180).

The exposure of high-profile corruption cases in the media and the limited political engagement have contributed to poor public perception of political corruption in Portugal. Recurring corruption scandals involving high-level politicians, local administrators and businesses abusing public funds have revealed that safeguards to counter corruption and abuse of power have been relatively inefficient, according to the National Integrity System Assessment 2012 by the Portuguese chapter of Transparency International (TIAC).

Regarding business and corruption, several sources indicate that corruption plays a limited role in Portugal's business culture. Foreign companies reportedly encounter limited corruption, but they do not consider corruption an obstacle for foreign direct investment. Access to financing and inefficient government bureaucracy are considered the most problematic factors for doing business, according to the surveyed business executives from World Economic Forum Global Competitiveness Report 2013–2014.

The EU report on corruption, revealed that the Portuguese perceive a high level of corruption (with 90% answering that corruption is widespread, compared to an EU average of 76%). However, the same report reveals that, when asked if they had actually witnessed corruption, only 1% responded positively (with an EU average of 5%).

See also 
 Crime in Portugal
 Police corruption in Portugal
 International Anti-Corruption Academy
 Group of States Against Corruption
 International Anti-Corruption Day
 ISO 37001 Anti-bribery management systems
 United Nations Convention against Corruption
 OECD Anti-Bribery Convention
 Transparency International

References

External links
Portugal Corruption Profile from the Business Anti-Corruption Portal

 
Politics of Portugal
Crime in Portugal by type
Portugal